Judith Sylvester (born 13 October 1977) is a German female volleyball player. She was part of the Germany women's national volleyball team.

She competed with the national team  She played at the 2002 FIVB Volleyball Women's World Championship in Germany, and  the 2004 Summer Olympics in Athens, Greece. She played with Properzi Volley Lodi in 2004.

Clubs
  Properzi Volley Lodi (2004)

See also
 Germany at the 2004 Summer Olympics

References

External links

cev.lu
berliner-kurier.de
Getty Images

1977 births
Living people
German women's volleyball players
Place of birth missing (living people)
Volleyball players at the 2000 Summer Olympics
Volleyball players at the 2004 Summer Olympics
Olympic volleyball players of Germany